Sun Baoguo (born February 28, 1961) is an academician of the Chinese Academy of Engineering (CAE), professor of food science and chemical engineering in Beijing Technology and Business University.

In China, Professor Sun is an expert in the research of spices and the only CAS/CAE academician for food science.

References 

Chinese food scientists
Members of the Chinese Academy of Engineering
Engineering educators
People from Yantai
1961 births
Living people
Tsinghua University alumni
Educators from Shandong
Academic staff of Beijing Technology and Business University
Scientists from Shandong